B- may refer to:

B-, a blood type
B- (grade), an academic grade
B − L, ('B minus L'), the difference between the baryon number (B) and the lepton number (L)